Kilsfjorden is a fjord in Volda Municipality in Møre og Romsdal county, Norway. The Kilsfjorden is located in the Sunnmørsalpene mountains and it flows north and joins the Austefjorden to form the Voldsfjorden.

See also
 List of Norwegian fjords

References

Fjords of Møre og Romsdal
Volda
Sunnmøre